Alois Moyo (born 28 October 1966), is a Zimbabwean–German actor and producer. He is best known for his roles in the films The Power of One and Iron Sky as well as the TV series Tatort.

Personal life
He was born on 28 October 1966 in Bulawayo, Zimbabwe. He currently lives in Germany.

Career
He started his career as an actor in theater in 1986 with the play Citizen Mind. In 1980, Moyo co-founded the first African Theater called 'Amakhosi Township Square Cultural Center' (ATSCC) in Zimbabwe which was initially used as a karate-club and turned into a cultural institution in Zimbabwe.Since 2005 he has been living in Germany and work as an actor for theatre, film and TV. He made his cinema debut with 1992 with the film Power of One directed by John Avildsen where he played the role of an African boxer and freedom fighter.

When living in Germany, he made his first production in German called Die Zofen in 2005 and then Afrika Montage in 2007. After the success of that, he made the second German production Steinstunde der Menschheit in 2008.

Filmography

References

External links
 

Living people
21st-century Zimbabwean male actors
1966 births
Zimbabwean film actors